Dehnowvan (also known as Deh-e Now Bam, Deh-e Now Band, Deh-i-Nauband, Deh Now, and Deh Now-e Bam) is a village in Dastgerdan Rural District, Dastgerdan District, Tabas County, South Khorasan Province, Iran. At the 2006 census, its population was 82, in 32 families.

References 

Populated places in Tabas County